Toki Ginjiro (1894 – April 1, 1976) was Governor of Toyama Prefecture (1935–1938) and Saitama Prefecture (1938–1941). He was the deputy editor of the Tokyo Shimbun, a newspaper published by the Chunichi Shimbun newspaper company. He was a graduate of the University of Tokyo.

1894 births
1976 deaths
Governors of Toyama Prefecture
Governors of Saitama Prefecture
Japanese Home Ministry government officials
Japanese Police Bureau government officials
University of Tokyo alumni
People from Wakayama Prefecture
Members of Chunichi Shimbun